{{Infobox film
| name           = True Love
| image          = TrueLoveFilm.jpg
| caption        = DVD cover
| director       = Nancy Savoca
| producer       = Richard GuayShelley Houis
| writer         = Nancy SavocaRichard Guay
| starring       = Annabella SciorraRon Eldard
| music          = 
| cinematography = Lisa Rinzler
| editing        = John Tintori
| studio         = United Artists
| distributor    = MGM/UA Communications Co.
| released       = 
| runtime        = 104 minutes
| country        = United States
| language       = EnglishItalian
| budget         = $750,000<ref name="sayles">Gerry Molyneaux, "John Sayles, Renaissance Books, 2000 p 183</ref>
| gross          = $1,354,268
}}True Love is a 1989 American comedy film directed by Nancy Savoca and starring Annabella Sciorra and Ron Eldard. An unflinching look at the realities of love and marriage which offers no "happily ever after" ending, it won the Grand Jury Prize at the 1989 Sundance Film Festival.

Plot
Donna and Michael are getting married. But first, they have to plan the reception, get the tux, buy the rings, and cope with their own uncertainty about the decision. Michael fears commitment. Donna has her doubts about Michael's immaturity. Both are getting cold feet.

Cast
Annabella Sciorra as Donna
Ron Eldard as Michael
Aida Turturro as Grace
Roger Rignack as Dom
Star Jasper as JC
Michael James Wolfe as Brian
Kelly Cinnante as Yvonne
Rick Shapiro as Kevin
Vincent Pastore as Angelo (Donna's father)

See alsoMarried to the Mob (1988)Moonstruck'' (1987)

References

External links

 

1989 films
1989 comedy films
American independent films
1989 independent films
1980s Italian-language films
Sundance Film Festival award winners
Films directed by Nancy Savoca
1989 directorial debut films
Films set in the Bronx
American comedy films
United Artists films
1980s English-language films
1980s American films
1989 multilingual films
American multilingual films